The Binary Format Description (BFD) language is an extension of XSIL which has added conditionals and the ability to reference files by their stream numbers, rather than by their public URLs.  A template written in the BFD language can be applied to a binary data file to produce a file with that data formatted with descriptive XML tags.  Such XML-tagged data is then readable by humans and generally by a wider set of computer programs than could read the original data file.

External links 
 Binary Format Description (BFD) Language

XML-based standards
Data modeling languages